Howrah Shiksha Sadan Boys' School is a school located at Howrah, India. This is a boys' school and is affiliated to the West Bengal Board of Secondary Education for Madhyamik Pariksha (10th Board exams), and to the West Bengal Council of Higher Secondary Education for Higher Secondary Examination (12th Board exams).

References 

Boys' schools in India
High schools and secondary schools in West Bengal
Schools in Howrah district
Educational institutions in India with year of establishment missing